Bursaria reevesii is a species of flowering plant in the family Pittosporaceae and is endemic to a few places near Marlborough in Queensland. It is an erect or sprawling shrub with spiny side-shoots, egg-shaped adult leaves with the narrower end towards the base, flowers with five white petals, and rounded fruit.

Description
New growth has elliptic leaves clustered around the spiny side-shoots, the edges of the leaves toothed. The flowers are white and arranged in small groups, each flower on a pedicel long with paired bracts at the base. Flowering mostly occurs in April and May and the fruit is a rounded capsule  in diameter.

Taxonomy
Bursaria reevesii was first formally described in 1999 by Lindy W. Cayzer, Michael Crisp and Ian Telford in the journal Australian Systematic Botany from specimens collected by Paul Irwin Forster in the Port Curtis district. The specific epithet (reevesii) honours Roger D. Reeves of New Zealand, for his work on the flora of serpentinite areas.

Distribution and habitat
This bursaria is only known from a few areas of serpentinite in the Marlborough area of Queensland.

References

reevesii
Pittosporaceae
Plants described in 1999
Flora of Queensland